The Adelaide Football Club, nicknamed The Crows, is an Australian rules football reserves team which competes in the South Australian National Football League (SANFL). Though the Adelaide Football Club was formed in 1990 for the national AFL competition, it was not until 2014 that the club was granted a license to field a dedicated reserves team in the SANFL.

History
The Adelaide Football Club was created as an entity in late 1990 as part of the Australian Football League's expansion into non-Victorian areas. The club first competed in the 1991 AFL season, finishing a respectable ninth on the ladder at the end of the season before first competing in a finals series in 1993.

From 2011, Adelaide club officials began expressing genuine interest in the formation of a stand-alone reserves side in the SANFL competition, rather than continuing with the draft policy which resulted in Adelaide-listed players being released to SANFL clubs when not selected for the AFL team. Originally, considerable opposition from the SANFL clubs and the South Australia Football Commission resulted in the club being denied a SANFL licence; Chairperson John Olsen contending such a change would "compromise the SANFL competition" as well as have a negative impact on league depth, talent, competitiveness and gate takings.

In response, Adelaide made it clear that it intended to establish a stand-alone reserves team from 2014, and that it was prepared to field the team in the South Australian Amateur Football League or in another state if the SANFL continued to refuse it entry. Following improved negotiations between Adelaide executives and SANFL clubs, the Crows' bid for a SANFL stand-alone side was approved by a vote of 6-2 of club executive representatives in August 2013. The 15-year agreement results in Adelaide being required to pay an annual licence fee of $400,000 and commitments to retain the integrity of the SANFL, including an agreement not to rest players.

Adelaide's first premiership match in the SANFL was against North Adelaide on April 6, 2014.

Club structure
As part of the formation of a stand-alone Adelaide Crows team in the SANFL, several points of agreement were made to apply to the club once it began competing from 2014:
 Adelaide SANFL team to be branded Adelaide Football Club
 All Adelaide Football Club listed players (including Rookie listed) to play with Adelaide SANFL team should they not be selected in the AFL team.
 SANFL Clubs can opt in / out of providing top up players to Adelaide.
 Should SANFL Clubs chose to opt in, they agree to always have a minimum of 2 players available for selection for Adelaide.
 These players will be: 18 – 22 years old and on a SANFL Club list.
 Should it be necessary, Adelaide may access further ‘top up’ players from community football. These players are not to have played at SANFL level for a minimum of 18 months and will receive $400 per match.
 Adelaide players are eligible to win the Magarey Medal.
 Adelaide players not eligible for State Game representation.

Ahead of the 2015 season, SANFL executives outlined additional new measures in relation to Adelaide's player list: 
To be eligible for inclusion on the AFC Supplementary ('top up' players) List, a person must be under the age of 23...a player may play as a top-up player past the age of 23 as long as he is first listed prior to the age of 23. Adelaide will be able to retain current contracted players already over the age of 23.
AFC cannot contract 'top up' players for more than one year.
Players included on the list of AFC cannot be recruited from outside of South Australia.
Adelaide no longer permitted to include players from rival SANFL clubs, with all top-up players to be recruited from Community football clubs.

Minor round matches
The Crows are permitted the use of one home game from its two annual matches against the  reserves team (nicknamed the Port Adelaide Magpies). However, as part of the agreement allowing Adelaide to field a stand-alone team in the SANFL, the Crows are required to play all other regular season games at the home ground of their opponents. The only exception to this was the Round 15 2016 match, when it hosted  at Thebarton.

List of home grounds

Guernsey
Since competing in the SANFL competition, Adelaide has worn a guernsey that differs from the home guernsey of their AFL side. From 2014 to 2019, the SANFL side wore a "v-shape" style guernsey, chosen by members, that featured the red, gold and navy colours of the traditional strip in the upper third of the front of the guernsey, with a white base covering the remainder of the guernsey. Ahead of the 2021 season, the Crows switched to a hooped guernsey similar to the traditional AFL strip, but with gold and blue hoops on a predominantly red base.

Season results and honours

Premierships: 0
Runners up: 0
Minor premierships: 0
Wooden spoons: 1 (2018)
Magarey Medalists: 0
Jack Oatey Medalists: 0
Ken Farmer Medalists: 0

See also

 South Australian National Football League
 Adelaide Football Club coaches
 Australian rules football in South Australia
 List of Adelaide Football Club players
 Sport in Australia
 Sport in South Australia
 Wikipedia listing of Adelaide players

References

External links
 
 Information about Heath Younie - Adelaide's inaugural SANFL coach

Adelaide Football Club
South Australian National Football League clubs
Australian rules football clubs in South Australia
Australian Reserve team football